Anthony Gerard Whelan  (born 23 November 1959) is an Irish former soccer player who played during the 1970s and 1980s.

He made his League of Ireland debut for Bohemians on 9 September 1979 and made 25 league appearances (4 goals) and two appearances for Bohs in European competition before transferring to Manchester United in August 1980 for £30,000. After making just one appearance for Manchester United as a substitute for Kevin Moran, he moved to America.

Anto then returned home to sign for Shamrock Rovers in 1983 and won the League in his first season at the club. After a spell at Cork City, he briefly signed back with the Rovers in 1986, where he played once in the European Cup. He made a total of 44 appearances for the Hoops.

He then moved on to Bray Wanderers.

He signed for Shelbourne in 1988, and won the League in 1992 and the 1993 FAI Cup. He won a League title under Dermot Keely at Dundalk in 1994–95, before returning to the Carlisle Grounds to finish his career at Bray Wanderers in the late 1990s.

He had a spell as player/manager at Drogheda United where he guided the club back to the Premier Division in the 1996–97 League of Ireland season.

He earned one cap for the Republic of Ireland U21 side.

Honours
Bohemians
Leinster Senior Cup: 1979–80

Shamrock Rovers
League of Ireland: 1983–84
Dublin City Cup: 1983–84

Shelbourne
League of Ireland: 1991–92
FAI Cup: 1992–93

Dundalk
League of Ireland: 1994–95

References

1959 births
Living people
Republic of Ireland association footballers
Association football defenders
Bohemian F.C. players
Shamrock Rovers F.C. players
Cork City F.C. players
Bray Wanderers F.C. players
Shelbourne F.C. players
Dundalk F.C. players
Drogheda United F.C. players
League of Ireland players
League of Ireland XI players
League of Ireland managers
Drogheda United F.C. managers
Republic of Ireland under-21 international footballers
Manchester United F.C. players
English Football League players
Republic of Ireland football managers